"Do What You Do" is a song by American R&B singer Jermaine Jackson, sibling of singers Michael and Janet Jackson and former member of The Jackson 5. It was released as the second single from his 1984 album, entitled Jermaine Jackson in the United States but marketed as Dynamite in the United Kingdom and other countries.

This was one of Jermaine's first releases with Arista Records after a long recording career with Motown Records, first as a member of The Jackson 5, then later as a solo artist. Although Jermaine Jackson never achieved the same level of solo success as sister Janet or brother Michael, "Do What You Do" was one of six top 20 solo hits on the Billboard Hot 100 chart for the singer. The song peaked at No. 13 on the Hot 100, No. 14 on the Billboard R&B chart, and spent three weeks atop the Billboard adult contemporary chart. In Canada it peaked on the RPM Top Singles chart at No. 29. The song was one of Jackson's biggest hits in the UK, where it reached No. 6 on the UK Singles Chart.

In the ballad, Jackson is requesting that his lover continue with certain enjoyable events they have both experienced in the past: Why don't you do what you do / when you did what you did to me?

Samples and covers
The song was sampled by Lil Wayne for "How Could Something" and by Chamillionaire for "Void In My Life".

French Singer/Songwriter and multi instrumentalist, Ethel Lindsey has also did a successful short cover of the tune on YouTube in 2013.
This unplugged cover has been immediately praised and approved by fans and Larry DiTommaso himself on Facebook.

Music video
The music video, directed by Bob Giraldi and produced by Anthony Payne, was an imitation of The Godfather and supermodel Iman played Jackson's love interest who eventually betrays him by trying to shoot him. After his henchmen take her away, it is not revealed what happened to her.

Charts

Weekly charts

Year-end charts

Certifications

See also
 List of number-one adult contemporary singles of 1984 (U.S.)

References

1984 singles
Jermaine Jackson songs
Music videos directed by Bob Giraldi
Contemporary R&B ballads
1984 songs
1980s ballads